The Croatian League season of 1940-1941 was the first held in the Banovina of Croatia. Hajduk Split was the league champion. The league was organized by the Croatian Football Federation.

League

Champions
Hajduk Split (Coach: Ljubo Benčić)
Miljenko KrstulovićLjubomir KokezaJozo MatošićGajo RaffanelliAnđelko MarušićBranko BakotićIvo AlujevićRatko KacijanFrane MatošićJiri SobotkaIvo Radovniković

References

External links
Croatia Domestic Football Full Tables

Croatian First league seasons
Croatia
Football
Football